Lamasco is an unincorporated community in Lyon County, Kentucky, United States. It was previously known as Parkersville, Cross Plains, and Flat Woods.

References

Unincorporated communities in Lyon County, Kentucky
Unincorporated communities in Kentucky